Chamaelaucium marchantii is a member of the family Myrtaceae endemic to Western Australia.

It blooms in October producing yellow-green flowers.

Found along creeks and on breakaway slopes in a small area in the Mid West region of Western Australia near Northampton where it grows in sandy soils.

References

marchantii
Plants described in 1987
Taxa named by Arne Strid